Solt is a surname. Notable people with the surname include:

 Andrew Solt (born 1947), British-born American producer, director, and writer of documentary films
 Andrew P. Solt (1916–1990), Hungarian-born Hollywood screenwriter
 Julie Stevenson Solt (born 1958), judge on the Circuit Court for Frederick County in Maryland
 Mary Ellen Solt (1920–2007), American concrete poet, essayist, translator, editor, and professor
 Ron Solt (born 1962), American football guard

See also
 Society of Our Lady of the Most Holy Trinity, Society of Apostolic Life within the Roman Catholic Church
 Solt, town in Hungary
 Zsolt, Hungarian masculine given name